RSGU Post Graduate College is situated in the city of Pukhrayan, Kanpur Dehat district, Uttar Pradesh state, India. It is a Government Aides college and is affiliated to Chhatrapati Shahu Ji Maharaj University (CJSM University) of Kanpur.

History
This college was founded  in July 1968  by Vishwambhar Nath Dwivedi, President of college management committee in memory of freedom fighter Ram Swarup Gupta.

Location
It is located on old Kalpi Road near cattle market in  Pukhrayan 1 kilometer from Pukhrayan railway station.

Faculties

Arts
Commerce

Facilities

NCC
Library
Playground
Sports

Courses
Govt. Aided: B.A. (Hindi, English, Sanskrit, Sociology, Political Science, History, Economics and Geography), M.A. (Hindi)
Self financed: B.Com., M.A. (Economics)

List of Principals

Rameshwar Prasad Dwivedi ( 1 August 1970---13 March 1987)
Gajodhar Lal Mishra      (14 March 1987----15 January 1988)
Chandrika Prasad Dwivedi (16 Jan. 1988---30 June 1990)
Ashok Kumar Gupta        (9 Aug. 1990---13 April 1992)
Chaturbhuj Dwivedi       (14 Aug. 1992---30 June 1993)
Surendra Prasad Tiwari   (10 July 1993---10 Sep. 1996)
Ashok Kumar Gupta        (Sep.03, 1996---26 April 2002)
Chandra Prakash Singh    (27 April 2002---16 June 2005)
Surendra Kumar Tiwari    (16 June 2005---

References

Postgraduate colleges in Uttar Pradesh
Colleges affiliated to Chhatrapati Shahu Ji Maharaj University
Education in Kanpur Dehat district
Educational institutions established in 1969
1969 establishments in Uttar Pradesh